Skelton is a civil parish in the Eden District, Cumbria, England. It contains 56 listed buildings that are recorded in the National Heritage List for England. Of these, three are listed at Grade I, the highest of the three grades, three are at Grade II*, the middle grade, and the others are at Grade II, the lowest grade.  The parish is mainly rural, and contains a number of villages and smaller settlements, including Skelton, Ellonby, Lamonby, Unthank, Unthank End, Laithes, and Ivegill.  Most of the listed buildings are country houses and smaller houses with associated structures, farmhouses and farm buildings.  The other listed buildings include churches and structures in the churchyards, a chapel, a bridge, a boundary stone, and a war memorial lych gate.


Key

Buildings

References

Citations

Sources

Lists of listed buildings in Cumbria
Listed buildings